The  is Japan's primary national research institute for information and communications. It is located at 4-2-1 Nukui-Kitamachi, Koganei, Tokyo 184-8795, Japan.

NICT was established as an Independent Administrative Institution in 2004 when Japan's Communications Research Laboratory (established 1896) merged with the Telecommunications Advancement Organization. Today NICT's mission is to carry out research and development in the field of information and communications technology.  It has a range of responsibilities including generating and disseminating Japan's national frequency and time standards; conducting type approval tests of radio equipment for the Global Maritime Distress Safety System (GMDSS) and marine radar based on Japan's Radio Law; and providing regular observations of the ionosphere and space weather. It also operates the JJY, a low frequency time signal.

In late August 2015, it was announced that a terahertz radiation scanner developed by the institute would be one of the instruments carried by the ESA's Jupiter Icy Moons Explorer, currently due for launch in 2022.

See also
 Independent Administrative Institution
 List of Independent Administrative Institutes in Japan

References 
 National Institute of Information and Communications Technology

Research institutes in Japan
Information technology research institutes
Aerospace research institutes
Government agencies established in 2004
2004 establishments in Japan
Independent Administrative Institutions of Japan
Space program of Japan